Admiral Sir John Moore, 1st Baronet, KB (24 March 1718 – 2 February 1779) was a British officer of the Royal Navy during the War of the Austrian Succession and the Seven Years' War. He eventually rose to the rank of admiral.

Childhood
Moore was born on 24 March 1718, as the third son of Henry Moore, the rector of Malpas, Cheshire and the son of Henry Hamilton-Moore, 3rd Earl of Drogheda. John's mother, Catherine, was the daughter of Sir Thomas Knatchbull, baronet, and was also the widow of Sir George Rooke. Moore was initially educated at the Whitchurch grammar school, Shropshire but by age 11 he appears on the books of HMS Lion for her voyage to the West Indies in 1729. Lion was at this time the flagship of Rear-Admiral Charles Stewart, a relative of Moore's.

Early naval service
Moore left Lion before it sailed however, transferring first to HMS Rupert, and then to HMS Diamond. Diamond came under the command in 1731 of George Anson. Moore spent a year aboard Diamond, before transferring to HMS Princess Amelia under Captain Edward Reddish. His next ship was HMS Squirrel, by now being captained by Moore's old commander George Anson. Moore spent the next three and a half years aboard Squirrel off the coast of Carolina. He was deployed to HMS Edinburgh for several months, which was at this time serving in the English Channel as the flagship of his relative, now Vice-Admiral Charles Stewart. Moore deployed to HMS Torrington, under Captain William Parry. He passed his lieutenant's examination on 6 April 1738 and joined HMS Lancaster at his new rank. Lancaster at this time was part of the fleet under Rear-Admiral Nicholas Haddock, patrolling off Cadiz and making forays into the Mediterranean.

Haddock returned to England because of ill health in 1742, leaving the fleet under the temporary command of Richard Lestock. Lestock was relieved of the command by the arrival of Vice-Admiral Thomas Mathews. Mathews brought Moore aboard his flagship, HMS Namur but later returned him to England aboard HMS Lenox to serve under another of Moore's relatives, Daniel Finch, 8th Earl of Winchilsea, who by this time had become First Lord of the Admiralty. Enjoying the patronage of so highly placed a relative meant that Moore would have expected more postings and the chance of further promotions. He was duly appointed to command the new frigate HMS Diamond on 24 December 1743, and sailed with her to the East Indies in May 1744 as part of a squadron under the command of Commodore Curtis Barnett. They stopped off at Madagascar, and on departing, Diamond and Medway were briefly detached to cruise the Strait of Malacca. Here they captured two French ships, one a rich merchant from Manila, and the other the large privateer Favorette, out of Pondicherry. The privateer was taken into service as HMS Medway Prize.  Moore was deployed to Barnett's flagship HMS Deptford. After Barnett died on 2 May 1746 Moore returned to England with the Deptford.

With Hawke, and during the peace
Moore was soon found another ship, being appointed in 1747 to HMS Devonshire. Devonshire was serving as the flagship of Rear-Admiral Edward Hawke. Moore was therefore present for Hawke's autumn cruise in the Bay of Biscay, and was present at the Second Battle of Cape Finisterre on 14 October, where Hawke defeated a French fleet under Admiral Desherbiers de l'Etenduère on 14 October. Moore appears to have acquitted himself in the battle, for Hawke entrusted him with taking the dispatches back to Britain. He also wrote 'I have sent this express by Captain Moore of the Devonshire … It would be doing great injustice to merit not to say that he signalized himself greatly in the action' During the period of peace that followed the end of the War of the Austrian Succession Moore was appointed to command the yacht HMY William & Mary, followed by a return to the Devonshire in April 1756.

Seven Years' War

Moore was a member of the court-martial of Admiral John Byng in January 1757, which led to Byng's execution. Moore later petitioned to be released from the oath of secrecy, and it was later intimated that he was 'on intimate terms with Byng's family'. His next appointment was as commodore of a squadron to go with his new post as commander-in-chief on the Leeward Islands Station in 1758. He subsequently raised his flag aboard HMS Cambridge. With the decision to distract French attention during the Seven Years' War, Moore was reinforced in January 1759 with a force of eleven ships of the line, besides frigates and small craft, and a military force under General Peregrine Hopson. He was then instructed to carry out attacks on French possessions in the West Indies. Moore took his force from Barbados to Martinique and reduced the enemy stronghold of Fort Negro, after which he covered the landing of troops in Fort Royal Bay. Despite the initial success, the undertaking was abandoned over Hopson's fears that the approaches to the French towns were mined.

Hopson then suggested an attack on Saint-Pierre, but Moore advised an assault on Guadeloupe instead.  For the Invasion of Guadeloupe Moore transferred his flag to HMS Woolwich. The fleet arrived off Basse-Terre on 22 January, and had deployed by 23 January.  Cambridge, in company with HMS Norfolk and HMS St George, were ordered to attack the main citadel. The resulting attack lasted from nine in the morning until four in the afternoon, and succeeded in silencing the defences, and starting serious fires throughout the French positions. Troops were then landed and drove the French into the hills, where they maintained their resistance, secretly supplied with provisions by the Dutch. Moore then received intelligence on 11 March that a large French naval force had arrived. He consequently shifted his position to Prince Rupert's Bay in Dominica to be able to outflank any attempt by this enemy fleet to relieve Guadeloupe. No such attempt was made and Guadeloupe and the adjacent small islands, the Saints and Deseada, surrendered to the British. After this success, Moore returned to England in 1760.

Final years
Moore was promoted to rear-admiral on 21 October 1762, spending the rest of the war as commander-in-chief in The Downs. He then became Commander-in-Chief, Portsmouth, a post he held for the next three years. He was created a baronet on 4 March 1766. A series of promotions followed, based on his seniority within the service. He was made vice-admiral on 18 October 1770, a Knight of the Bath in 1772, and admiral on 29 January 1778. He had suffered from gout since the 1760s, and his health had been steadily declining. The attacks had become violent by 1777. His last public duty was to join his old commander Edward Hawke in signing a protest against the holding of a court-martial against Admiral Augustus Keppel in December 1778. John Moore died two months later, on 2 February 1779.

Family and personal life
Moore married Penelope, the daughter of General William Matthew sometime around 1756. They had one son, who died young, and four daughters. The baronetcy became extinct on his death.

Notes

References

|-

|-

1718 births
1779 deaths
Baronets in the Baronetage of Great Britain
Knights Companion of the Order of the Bath
Royal Navy personnel of the Seven Years' War
Royal Navy admirals
Royal Navy personnel of the War of the Austrian Succession
People from Malpas, Cheshire